The 2018 Commonwealth Games venues were mostly located in the host city of Gold Coast, though some other events require facilities located elsewhere.

Sporting venues
The Gold Coast 2018 was hosted across 18 venues located on the Gold Coast and in Brisbane, Townsville and Cairns. Sporting venues were well ahead available of Gold Coast 2018 ensuring that they were used and tested before the Games.

Central Gold Coast City

North Gold Coast City

South Gold Coast City

Outside Gold Coast City

Costs 
The Australian and Queensland Governments and the City of Gold Coast invested A$320 million to deliver new and upgraded venues.

The cost invested on building new venues are below:

The cost invested on upgrading the venues are below:

Athlete’s Village 

The Athletes Village was officially opened from 25 March 2018 and provided accommodation and services to 6,600 athletes and officials in 1252 permanent dwellings. It was located in Southport, Gold Coast and was built at a cost of A$550 million. There were 1170 one and two-bedroom apartments and 82 three-bedroom townhouses. The village had three zones - International, Residential and Operational. The residential zone accommodated athletes and officials and also offered recreation, gym and medical facilities. The equipment in the gym was sponsored by Technogym. Adjoining the gym was the Athlete Recovery Area. The International Zone consisted of retail services, shops and the main dining hall. The Festival 2018 events were also held in the International Zone. The Dining hall served over 18,000 meals per day to the athletes during the Games. Australian telecommunications company Optus opened a store in the International zone named "Yes Optus Store" which provided free calling services to the athletes and officials and other services such as phone charging and watching events of the Games in televisions. Optus also provided free Wifi services in the village.

See also 

List of Commonwealth Games venues

References

 
Venues of the Commonwealth Games
venues